Huanglong (Mandarin: 黄龙乡) is a township in Songpan County, Ngawa Tibetan and Qiang Autonomous Prefecture, Sichuan, China. In 2010, Huanglong Township had a total population of 1,423: 769 males and 655 females: 174 aged under 14, 1,191 aged between 15 and 65 and 59 aged over 65.

See also 
 List of township-level divisions of Sichuan

References 

Township-level divisions of Sichuan
Songpan County